Bardaskan County is in Razavi Khorasan province, Iran. Bardaskan has also been called Baradaskan (باردسکن) or Berdaskan (برداسکن). The capital of the county is the city of Bardaskan. At the 2006 census, the county's population was 68,392 in 18,229 households. The following census in 2011 counted 72,626 people in 21,171 households. At the 2016 census, the county's population was 75,631 in 23,732 households.

Azad University is the only institute of higher education since 2000. Saffron, pistachios, and figs are the main commercial products from the county.

Administrative divisions

The population history and structural changes of Bardaskan County's administrative divisions over three consecutive censuses are shown in the following table. The latest census shows three districts, six rural districts, and three cities.

Geography
Bardaskan is located in the Khorasan Razavi province at the northern edge of the Namak Desert (Great Salt Desert). The weather in northern Bardaskan is cold while the weather in southern and central Bardaskan varies from semi-dry to hot and dry. There are no perennial rivers, but there are several seasonal rivers.

Economy
Bardaskan currently has three towns and 293 villages. The main jobs are farming and animal husbandry. Staple crops are wheat, barley, cotton and cumin seed, and pistachio, saffron, pomegranate, fig and grape products.

References

 

Counties of Razavi Khorasan Province